Hinterberger is a surname. Notable people with the surname include:

Ernst Hinterberger (1931–2012), Austrian writer
Mary Hinterberger (1954–2009), American beauty pageant contestant

See also
Hinterberger-Konig geometry, used in sector instrument for mass spectrometry